USS LST-20 was a United States Navy  used exclusively in the Asiatic-Pacific Theater during World War II and manned by a United States Coast Guard crew. Like many of her class, she was not named and is properly referred to by her hull designation.

Construction
LST-20 was laid down on 5 October 1942, at Pittsburgh, Pennsylvania, by the Dravo Corporation; launched on 15 February 1943; sponsored by Miss Anne B. Sylvester. She was floated down the Ohio and Mississippi rivers and entered commissioned service on 14 May 1943.

Service history
During the war, LST-20 served exclusively in the Asiatic-Pacific Theater from November 1943 until November 1945.

LST-20 participated in operations in the Gilbert Islands during November and December 1943.

In October 1944, LST-20 moved to the Philippines to participate in General Douglas MacArthur's promised liberation of the islands from the Japanese occupation. LST-20 participated at the Leyte landings and the Battle of Luzon Lingayen Gulf landings in January 1945.

LST-20 finished her combat career with the assault and occupation of Okinawa Gunto in April 1945.

Postwar career
Following the war, LST-20 performed occupation duty in the Far East until early November 1945. She returned to San Diego on 23 December 1945. She departed San Diego on 11 January 1946, for Galveston, Texas, via the Canal Zone, arriving there on 1 February 1946, and was decommissioned on 3 April 1946. She was struck from the Navy list on 19 June 1946, and was transferred to the Maritime Administration (MARCOM) on 8 October 1947.

Merchant service
On 8 October 1947, MARCOM sold LST-20 to Southern Shipwrecking Company that in turn resold her to Pan Ore Steamship Company who reflagged her for Panama, her final disposition is unknown.

Honors and awards
LST-20 earned four battle stars for her World War II service.

References

Bibliography

External links

 

LST-1-class tank landing ships of the United States Navy
World War II amphibious warfare vessels of the United States
Ships built in Pittsburgh
1943 ships
United States Navy ships crewed by the United States Coast Guard
Ships built by Dravo Corporation